Allan Dean (born April 29, 1938) is an American trumpeter who has spent much of his career working as a chamber music player in the United States.  Mr. Dean's career is particularly well established in the New York musical scene—primarily because of his long involvement with the New York Brass Quintet. While in New York City, he was a prolific commercial trumpeter, recording jingles for everything from ABC Nightly News to the Olympics. He is also a founding member of Summit Brass, and currently plays with the Saint Louis Brass Quintet. His arrangements are often featured on recordings with these ensembles.

Dean was also involved in the period instrument revival in the 1960s and '70s in the United States. He was one of the first American trumpeters to master the natural trumpet and the  cornetto. He was a charter member of Calliope (Renaissance band), the groundbreaking period instrument group, which is no longer active.

Mr. Dean has taught at the Eastman School of Music, Indiana University, and the North Carolina School of the Arts. In 2019 he retired from the Yale School of Music in New Haven, Connecticut and is on faculty at the Norfolk Chamber Music Festival in Norfolk, Connecticut.

Partial discography
American Brass Quintet, A Storm in the Land; Music of the 26th N.C. Regimental Band
American Brass Quintet, Cheer Boys, Cheer! Music of the 26th N.C. Regimental Band
Contemporary Chamber Ensemble, Spectrum
Contemporary Chamber Ensemble, Weill/Milhaud
New York Cornet and Sacbut Ensemble, Alleluia
New York Cornet and Sacbut Ensemble, When Heaven Came to Earth; German Brass Music from the Baroque
Anthony Plog, Colors for Brass
Bobby Shew/Allen Vizzutti/Vincent DiMartino, Trumpet Summit
David Taylor, Rzewski, Liebman, Ewazen, Dlugoszewski

With Calliope
 P. D. Q. Bach, Classical WTWP Talkity-Talk Radio (1991)
Calliope, Diversions (1994)
Calliope, Dances - A Renaissance Revel (1992)
Calliope, Calliope Swings (1999)
Calliope, Bestiary, A Music Theater Piece for Renaissance Ensemble

With New York Brass Quintet
New York Brass Quintet, Bach and Before
New York Brass Quintet, 50 Years

With Saint Louis Brass Quintet
Daniel Perantoni, Daniel in the Lion's Den (1994)
Saint Louis Brass Quintet, Fascinating Rhythms (2007)
Saint Louis Brass Quintet, Baroque Brass
Saint Louis Brass Quintet, Colors for Brass
Saint Louis Brass Quintet, Pops
Saint Louis Brass Quintet, Renaissance Faire

With Summit Brass
Paul Hindemith, Complete Brass Works (1995)
Summit Brass, American Tribute
Summit Brasas, Delights
Summit Brass, Paving the Way
Summit Brass, Spirits of Fire
Summit Brass, Summit Brass Live
Summit Brass, A Summit Brass Night
Summit Brass, Toccata & Fugue

External links
Official Website
Saint Louis Brass Quintet
Summit Brass
Yale Faculty Page

American trumpeters
American male trumpeters
Living people
Yale School of Music faculty
1938 births
21st-century trumpeters
21st-century American male musicians